Presidential elections were held in Poland on 9 October and 23 October 2005. The outgoing President of Poland, Aleksander Kwaśniewski, had served two five-year terms and was unable to stand for a third term. Lech Kaczyński defeated Donald Tusk to become President of Poland.

Background 
Two center-right candidates, Donald Tusk, chairman of the Civic Platform (PO) and Deputy Marshal of the Sejm, and Lech Kaczyński, honorary chairman of Law and Justice (PiS) and mayor of Warsaw, led the poll in the first round, as was widely expected. As neither received 50 percent of the vote, a second-round was held on 23 October. In this round, Kaczyński defeated Tusk, polling 54.04 percent of the vote.

Although both leading candidates came from the center-right, and their two parties had planned to form a coalition government following the legislative elections on 25 September, there were important differences between Tusk and Kaczyński. Tusk wanted to enforce separation of church and state, favored rapid European integration and supported a free-market economy. Kaczyński was very socially conservative, a soft Eurosceptic, and supported state interventionism. Such differences led to the failure of PiS-PO coalition talks in late October.

Włodzimierz Cimoszewicz, the candidate of the Alliance of the Democratic Left, which was the governing party before the legislative election withdrew from the race on September 14. At the time he withdrew he was third in the polls, still having the most chances to get to the second round (besides Kaczyński and Tusk).

Other candidates, who withdrew from the elections, but initially have signed to, were Zbigniew Religa and Maciej Giertych. Daniel Tomasz Podrzycki, who had also signed, died in an accident before the elections.

Ten people had registered themselves in election procedure, but failed to gather 100,000 support signatures: Arnold Buzdygan, Stanisław Ceberek, Gabriel Janowski, Jan Antoni Kiełb, Waldemar Janusz Kossakowski, Marian Romuald Rembelski, Zbigniew Roliński, Sławomir Salomon, Maria Szyszkowska, Bolesław Tejkowski.

The figure of Józef Tusk, grandfather of incumbent Polish Prime Minister Donald Tusk, was in the center of the "Wehrmacht affair" over his brief period of service after being drafted into the German army during the late stages of World War II, which was the biggest controversy of the election.

Candidates

Physician Jan Pyszko (Polish League), 75

Withdrawn

MEP Maciej Giertych (League of Polish Families), 69

Dead
Journalist Daniel Podrzycki (Polish Labour Party), 42

Opinion polls

Results 
Voters turnout in the first round was quite low with only 49.7 percent of all eligible voters casting their votes.

References

External links
Angus Reid Consultants - Election Tracker
"Presidential Calculator", Rzeczpospolita 
Official results
Reference files on the Poland's presidential candidates.

 
Poland
President
Presidential elections in Poland
History of Poland (1989–present)
Lech Kaczyński
Poland